Amane Beriso Shankule (born 13 October 1991) is an Ethiopian long-distance runner. In 2022, she improved her marathon personal best by nearly six minutes at the 2022 Valencia Marathon, placing third on the world all-time list.

Career
Amane Beriso won the Copenhagen Half Marathon in 2014. A year later, the 23-year-old set an unofficial personal best in the event of 1:08:43 when winning Roma-Ostia Half Marathon. In 2016, she debuted in the marathon taking the second place at the Dubai Marathon with a time of 2:20:48, a position which she also secured at the 2017 Prague Marathon (2:22:15).

After 2017 Prague Marathon, Beriso dealt with a series of injuries to her leg and knee. She won the Mumbai Marathon in 2020 (2:24:51) but was never fully healthy until 2022.

In August 2022, she took victory at the Mexico City Marathon at an elevation of over 7,000 feet (2:25:05). On 4 December, the 31-year-old pulled off a big upset with a 2:14:58 win at the Valencia Marathon, an improvement of 5:50 on her 2016 personal best, to set a course record, Ethiopian national record and move to third on the world all-time ranking list. She became only the third woman ever to break 2:15:00 and according to her coach world record (2:14:04) would have been achievable if the pacemakers, who stayed with struggling Letesenbet Gidey after the 36 km mark, had run with her.

Personal bests
 10 kilometres – 32:52 (Langueux 2015)
 Half marathon – 1:10:54 (Warsaw 2015) (1:08:43 not legal, 2015)
 Marathon – 2:14:58 (Valencia 2022) , #3rd fastest of all time

References

External links
 World Athletics profile

1991 births
Living people
Ethiopian female long-distance runners
21st-century Ethiopian women